Robert "Bobby" Jacques (born 16 February 1957) is a French former professional football player and manager.

Honours 
Paris Saint-Germain
 Division 1: 1985–86

References

External links 
 
 

1957 births
Living people
People from Petit-Bourg
French footballers
Guadeloupean footballers
French people of Guadeloupean descent
Black French sportspeople
Association football wingers
Association football forwards
INF Vichy players
Valenciennes FC players
AS Nancy Lorraine players
Paris Saint-Germain F.C. players
AS Saint-Étienne players
Ligue 1 players
French Division 3 (1971–1993) players